Mong Lem or Mönglem (also known as Meng-lian in Chinese) was a Shan state in of what is today the Menglian Dai-Lahu-Va Autonomous County of the Pu'er Prefecture, Yunnan region, China.

History
Mong Lem was one of the Koshanpye or "Nine Shan States" in China. The others were Möngmāu, Hsikwan, Möngnā, Sandā, Hosā, Lasā, Möngwan and Küngma (Köng-ma).
It was a tributary both of Kingdom of Burma and China until the late 19th century when the British signed an agreement that made the Chinese Shan states become part of China.

The rulers of the state bore the title saopha.

Möng Lam

Saophas 

 Hkam Pak Hpa 1278-? 
 Tau Saikwi 1534-1549 
 Tau Phai Hpa 1549-1584 
 Tau Phaikhang 1584-1612 
 Tau Phaiyen 1612-1664 
 Tau Phaisong 1664-1688
 Tau Phaikhyen 1688-1721 
 Tau Phaitin 1721-1748
 Tau Phaisun 1748-1758 
 Tau Phaimyin 1795-1810 
 Sao Hkam Som (younger brother of Tau Phaimyin) 1810-1848 
 Sao Hong Hkam (nephew of Sao Hkam Som and son of Tau Phaimyin) 1848-1879 
 Sao Main Hkam 1879-?

See also
Chiang Hung

References

External links
Menglian Dai, Lahu and Va Autonomous County, Si Mao City, Yunnan Province (云南省思茅市孟连傣族拉祜族佤族自治县): 665800

Shan States
Former countries in Chinese history
Tusi in Yunnan
Pu'er City